Artificial human companions may be any kind of hardware or software creation designed to give companionship to a person. These can include digital pets, such as the popular Tamagotchi, or robots, such as the Sony AIBO. Virtual companions can be used as a form of entertainment, or they can be medical or functional, to assist the elderly in maintaining an acceptable standard of life.

Introduction 
Senior citizens make up an increasing percentage of the population in the Western nations, and, according to Judith Masthoff of the University of Brighton, they tend to live alone and have a limited social network. Studies also show that those elderly living in such circumstances have an increased risk of developing depression and dementia and have a shorter life span than more socially connected seniors.

It has been known to gerontologists for some time that pets -- particularly those such as cats and dogs that exhibit a range of behaviors and emotions -- help prevent depression in the elderly. Studies also show some beneficial results from electronic pets such as Sony's Aibo  and Omron's NeCoRo; however, the therapeutic value of such artificial pets remains limited by the capabilities of technology. A recent solution to physical limitations of technology comes from GeriJoy, in the form of virtual pets for seniors. Seniors can interact with GeriJoy's pets by petting them through the multitouch interface of standard consumer-grade tablets, and can even have intelligent conversations with the pets.

Television viewing among the elderly represents a significant percentage of how their waking hours are spent, and the percentage increases directly with age. Seniors typically watch TV to avoid loneliness; yet TV limits social interaction, thus creating a vicious circle.

Masthoff purports that it is possible to develop an interactive, personalized form of television that would allow the viewer to engage in natural conversation and learn from these conversations, as well as becoming more physically active which can help in the management of Type 2 Diabetes.

Such applications have existed for decades. The earliest, such as the "psychologist" program ELIZA, did little more than identify key words and feed them back to the user, but Kenneth Colby's 1972 PARRY program at Stanford University -- far superior to ELIZA -- exhibited many of the features researchers now seek to put into a dialog system, above all some form of emotional response and having something "it wants to say", rather than being completely passive like ELIZA. The Internet now has a wide range of chatterbots but they are no more advanced, in terms of plausibility as conversationalists, than the systems of forty years ago and most users tire of them after a couple of exchanges. Meanwhile, two developments have advanced the field in different ways: first, the Loebner Prize, an annual competition for the best computer conversationalist, substantially advanced performance. Its winners could be considered the best chatterbots, but even they never approach a human level of capacity as can be seen from the site.

Secondly a great deal of industrial and academic research has gone into effective conversationalists, usually for specific tasks, such as selling rail or airline tickets. The core issue in all such systems is the dialog manager which is the element of system that determines what the system should say next and so appear intelligent or compliant with the task at hand. This research, along with work on computing emotion, speech research and Embodied Conversational Agents (ECAs) has led to the beginnings of more companionable systems, particularly for the elderly. The EU supported Companions Project is a 4-year, 15-site project to build such companions, based at the University of Sheffield.

Technology and artificial human companions in social work 
Historically, the concept of artificial intelligence (AI) has rapidly changed numerous forms of society and different workforces. The field in it is focusing on, that being Social Work, demonstrates one of the numerous workforces that can and has utilized the benefits of AI. Social work is a field that can especially benefit from AI, because of the expansive number of fields that it has. As an example, Social Work can focus on the medical field, geriatrics, group work, and many more fields. 
In Narula's article, many forms and examples of AI are given, and a number of those examples are applicable to the field of Social Work, especially within the medical and geriatric fields.  Within the realm of geriatric Social Work, in the last decades, it has been increasing dependent on AI's fraud prevention within banking systems.  Because older adults are more vulnerable to financial manipulation and abuse, this system of AI is especially integral for the protection of the geriatric population.

However, there are other realms of social work that have seen beneficial change from AI over the past decades. One example, is the use of AI-assisted online social therapy groups. D'Alfonso wrote about the implications of AI within social support groups, stating that “integration of user experience with a sophisticated and cutting-edge technology to deliver content is necessary to redefine online interventions in youth mental health”.  The form of AI is especially beneficial and necessary due to the cost-effective and engaging nature.  Also, forms of surveillance, brought up by Quan-Haase, demonstrate AI and technology's growing prominence and beneficial nature within Social Work. The changes of surveillance highlight these changes, especially the nature of the functional view, in which surveillance and AI are essential in the protection and safety of society.

In addition, there are other forms of AI that could contribute to the future of social work. De Greeff and Belpaeme write that the social learning of social robots has increased and become more prominent in coming decades. It is written that “social robots often tend to be designed to portray a character, thus stimulating their anthropomorphisation by human interactants and inviting an interaction-style that is natural to people. Both a robot's appearance and behaviour can strengthen interactants' interpretation of dealing with a social agent, rather than with a piece of equipment”. This substantiates that robots and AI are in the process of being used for communication and support for humans, and AI is used in order to allow technology and robots to become adept at linguistics and social cues.

See also

Digital pet
Eccky
Ludobot
Tamagotchi
Digital life form

References

External links

User modeling as a goal in itself: an artificial companion for the elderly

Multimodal interaction